Llanwrtyd railway station (also known as Llanwrtyd Wells railway station) serves the town of Llanwrtyd Wells, Powys, Wales. The railway station is located at street level at Station Road near the town centre. All trains serving the station are operated by Transport for Wales.

History

Opened by the LNWR on 6 May 1867, as part of the company's Central Wales Extension Railway project, it is the location of one of the route's five remaining passing loops. The loop points and associated indicators have recently been replaced as part of a £5 million project by Network Rail to renew all five loops on the line.

Facilities
The main buildings on the northbound platform still stand and whilst the station is now unstaffed (tickets must be bought on the train), a waiting room is not available within this building, a shelter near the main building is available. The main building is now run by Llanwrtyd Wells Community Transport (LWCT), who use it as a community centre and meeting rooms. A public phone and customer help point is available on this side, whilst the southbound platform has a waiting shelter only. Digital information screens and timetable posters provide train running details. Step-free access is available to both platforms, though the southbound one requires the use of a steeply inclined ramp.

Services
It is the crossover point where some northbound and southbound services meet (except on Sundays), and where train crews can swap between trains.

References

Further reading

External links 

Railway stations in Powys
DfT Category F2 stations
Former London and North Western Railway stations
Railway stations in Great Britain opened in 1867
Heart of Wales Line
Railway stations served by Transport for Wales Rail
1867 establishments in Wales
Llanwrtyd Wells
Grade II listed buildings in Powys
Grade II listed railway stations in Wales